Yuan-Tsong Chen (YT Chen) is a Taiwanese physician scientist, notable for his work on human genetic disorders. He is the director emeritus (2001–2010) and distinguished research fellow (2001–present) of the Institute of Biomedical Sciences, Academia Sinica, Taiwan, and also tenured professor of pediatrics of Duke University (1993–present) Chen was a 2019 awardee of Taiwan's , as were Yuan-Pern Lee and Wei Fu-chan.

Research
Chen's achievements include drug development of recombinant enzyme replacement therapy for Pompe disease, an enzyme-deficiency disorder that causes muscle damage, cardiorespiratory failure and in its severe infantile form, death by 2 years of age. The drug, eventually named "Myozyme", was further developed by Genzyme and received the regulatory marketing approval in Europe and USA in 2006. The story of a father searching for a treatment for his two children with Pompe disease and the development of this rug has been adapted to a film entitled Extraordinary Measures featured Harrison Ford and Brendan Fraser. Chen's research into the disease helped Taiwan develop screening for newborns with Pompe disease, the first nation in the world to offer such medical testing.

Later, Chen's research focus extends to the pharmacogenetics of adverse drug reactions and drug efficacy. His team identified VKORC1 gene variants to play a major role in determining the warfarin dosage, a widely prescribed anticoagulant. They teamed with International Warfarin Consortium to formulate a universal algorithm that can better predict an optimal dosage for each patient. His team also discovered genetic links to the incidence of type 2 diabetes, the strong association of the gene HLA-B*15:02 with carbamazepine, a drug used to treat epilepsy, and that of the gene HLA-B*58:01 with allopurinol, a widely prescribed drug for gout, to induce Stevens–Johnson syndrome (SJS) and toxic epidermal necrolysis (TEN). These pharmacogenetic researches have prompted the FDA to relabel the two commonly prescribed drugs, carbamazepine and warfarin,  with genetic information and to recommend genetic screening before prescribing the medication, and paved the road for personalized and precision medicine.

Personal life
Chen was questioned as part of a 2010 investigation into corruption. Prosecutors claimed that Chen and his wife held executive positions at the biomedical company Phamigene. The case closed without an indictment of Chen. Subsequently, the government of Taiwan discussed amendments to the Act Governing the Employment of Educational Personnel, so that full-time researchers and university teachers could establish private enterprises or serve as company presidents. Eventually, amendments to the Fundamental Act of Science and Technology were passed so that public sector researchers could take some positions at private companies.

Chen Award
In partnership with his wife, Mrs. Alice Der-Shan Chen, who together started the Chen Foundation, they and the Human Genome Organisation annually present the Chen Award to those with research accomplishments in human genetics and genomics in Asia Pacific.

References

1948 births
Living people
Taiwanese expatriates in the United States
Scientists from Taipei
National Taiwan University alumni
Columbia University alumni
Duke University faculty
Taiwanese geneticists
20th-century Taiwanese scientists
21st-century Taiwanese scientists
Members of Academia Sinica